WKVK (106.7 FM) is a radio station broadcasting a Contemporary Christian format. Licensed to Semora, North Carolina, it serves a large swath of central North Carolina and Southside Virginia as an outlet of K-LOVE.  The station is currently owned by Educational Media Foundation.

Southern Entertainment Corporation signed on WPXX as a 6,000-watt class A FM in early 1996 from nearby Danville, Virginia, as contemporary hits "Danville Pixx 106.7". Studios were located on Northmont Boulevard, just off North Main Street with a tower site west of Danville. On July 1, 1998, WPXX flipped to a satellite-delivered oldies format as "Pixx Pure Gold 106.7". After several offers from companies looking to move this valuable frequency to the bigger surrounding markets, K-Love parent company Educational Media Foundation bought WPXX in 2000, taking the station non-commercial as WKVE with the network's contemporary Christian format. Several months later, the newly minted WKVE upgraded to a class "C2" with 50,000 watts, adding Durham, Raleigh, Cary, Chapel Hill, Burlington and Greensboro to their coverage area from a new tower site near Yanceyville, in Caswell County.  On March 9, 2009, the station became WKVK, and the former call letters went to a classic rock station at 103.1 in Mount Pleasant, Pennsylvania.

Translators
In addition to the main station, WKVK is relayed by an additional five translators to widen its broadcast area.

External links
Official website

K-Love radio stations
KVK
KVK
Radio stations established in 1996
1996 establishments in North Carolina
Educational Media Foundation radio stations